Bridenbaugh is a surname. Notable people with the surname include:

Carl Bridenbaugh (1903–1992), American historian 
Philip Henry Bridenbaugh (1890–1990), American football player and coach